Karakhanid Turkic, also known as Khaqani Turkic, was a historical Turkic language developed in the 11th century during the Middle Turkic period under the Kara-Khanid Khanate. It has been described as the first literary Islamic Turkic language. It is sometimes classified under the Old Turkic category, rather than Middle Turkic, as it is contemporary to the East Old Turkic languages of Orkhon and Old Uyghur. Eastern Middle Turkic languages, namely Khorezmian and later Chagatai are descendents of the Karakhanid language.

Karakhanid vocabulary was influenced by Arabic and Persian loanwords, but the language itself was still noted to be similar to the Old Uyghur language. The language was written using the Arabic script. Mahmud al-Kashgari's Dīwān Lughāt al-Turk and Yūsuf Balasaguni's Kutadgu Bilig are considered to be important literary works written in Karakhanid language.

History 
It was spoken between the 5th-15th centuries. It is one of the three parts of the Old Turkish period. According to Ligeti's classification, it is divided into three periods:

a) Mani and Buddha translations and the foundation period of Uyghur written language

b) Chagatai writing language period

c) Kipchak and Oghuz language relics period

Hakaniye Turkish can also be called the Old Kashgar language. It was the literary language used by the Turks in this area until the beginning of the 14th century. Karakhanid Turkish and Khorezmian Turkish in the west were replaced by Chagatai Turkish in the Timurid period.

Alphabet

Additional Letters 
Only 18 of these letters are used. There are seven more letters which have no place in spelling, but are necessary in pronunciation and are not considered as root letters. Turkish languages cannot exist without these letters. These are:

References 

Extinct languages of Asia